Digital X-ray radiogrammetry  is a method for measuring bone mineral density (BMD). Digital X-ray radiogrammetry is based on the old technique of radiogrammetry. In DXR, the cortical thickness of the three middle metacarpal bones of the hand is measured in a digital X-ray image. Through a geometrical operation the thickness is converted to bone mineral density. The BMD is corrected for porosity of the bone, estimated by a texture analysis performed on the cortical part of the bone.

Like other technologies for estimating the bone mineral density, the outputs are an areal BMD value, a T-score and a Z-score for assessing osteoporosis and the risk of bone fracture.

Digital X-ray radiogrammetry is primarily used in combination with digital mammography for osteoporosis screening, where same mammography machine that is used to acquire breast X-ray images is also used to acquire a hand image for BMD measurement. Due to high precision, DXR is also used for monitoring change in bone mineral density over time.

See also
Dual-energy X-ray absorptiometry

References

Radiology